Haroon Rashid is an academic in chemistry and is Vice-Chancellor at the University of Peshawar.

He has published 22 research papers in international journals and secured research funds of over 52 million PKR of which provided for the establishment of a Nuclear Medicine Research Laboratory at the University of Peshawar.  He is on the editorial board of the Journal of the Chemical Society of Pakistan and previously served as the chief editor of the Journal of Science and Technology at the University of Peshawar.

References 

 University of Peshawar, Convocation-2005   http://www.upesh.edu.pk/news.php?news_id=127
 T.J Grubisha, Cultural Affairs Officer in US Embassy Islamabad calls on Vice Chancellor University of Peshawar Professor Dr. Haroon Rashid   http://www.upesh.edu.pk/news.php?news_id=294

Living people
Academic staff of the University of Peshawar
Year of birth missing (living people)
University of Missouri alumni
Pakistani chemists
Vice-Chancellors of the University of Peshawar